Jacopo Colonna or Giacomo Fantoni (died  1540) was an Italian sculptor active in the Renaissance.

Born in Venice, he was a pupil of Jacopo Sansovino. He completed a St Jerome statue for the church of San Salvatore, a weeping Christ now in the Gallerie dell'Accademia of Venice. In Padua he completed a St. Anthony in stucco. He was commissioned by Luigi Cornaro, stucco depictions of Minerva, Diana, and Venus, as well as a statue of Mars. He died at Bologna in 1540.

Sources

1540 deaths
Republic of Venice sculptors
Renaissance sculptors
Year of birth unknown
16th-century Italian sculptors
Italian male sculptors
16th-century Venetian people